Ave Maria is the fifth studio album by Polish singer Maria Peszek, released in 2021 by Mystic Production. Peszek co-wrote and co-produced the material with Kamil Pater. Thematically, the album criticises Poland's conservative politics and child sexual abuse in the Catholic Church, and expresses support towards women's rights and the Polish LGBT community. Peszek described it as "probably the most beautiful album [she has] ever recorded". Ave Maria received generally positive reviews and debuted atop the Polish album sales chart.

Track listing 
 "Ave Maria" – 4:22
 "J*bię to wszystko" – 4:53 ("Fuck It All")
 "Virunga" – 3:56
 "Dzikie dziecko" – 3:18 ("Wild Child")
 "Szambo wybiło" – 5:25 ("Cesspit Has Broken")
 "Viva la vulva" – 3:37 ("Long Live the Vulva")
 "Lovesong" – 3:33
 "Pusto" – 5:54 ("Empty")
 "Nic o Polsce" – 3:56 ("Nothing About Poland")
 "Barbarka" (feat. Oskar83) – 5:00

Singles 
 2021: "Virunga"
 2021: "Ave Maria"
 2021: "J*bię to wszystko"
 2021: "Barbarka"

Charts

References

External links 
 Official audio stream on YouTube
 The official Maria Peszek website

2021 albums
Maria Peszek albums
Polish-language albums